Fort Wayne, Indiana is the second-largest city in the U.S. state of Indiana.

Fort Wayne may also refer to:
Fort Wayne (fort), the fort which gave its name to the city of Fort Wayne
Fort Wayne (Detroit), a fort in Michigan
Fort Wayne (Indian Territory), two early frontier army forts in Indian Territory (now Oklahoma)
Battle of Old Fort Wayne
USS Fort Wayne (ID-3786), a United States Navy transport during World War I
Purdue Fort Wayne Mastodons, the athletic program of Purdue University Fort Wayne